The Rorick House Museum, also known as the Malcolm A. Moody House, is a museum located in The Dalles, Oregon, United States. The building was originally built in 1850 as a two-room residence for non-commissioned officers from Fort Dalles, this is the oldest remaining house in The Dalles. It was subsequently occupied by U.S. Representative Malcolm A. Moody, and has ultimately become a museum. The house is the current headquarters for the Wasco County Historical Society.

See also
National Register of Historic Places listings in Wasco County, Oregon

References

External links
 History of Rorick House - Historic The Dalles
 Information on the Wasco County Historical Society

Houses on the National Register of Historic Places in Oregon
Houses completed in 1850
National Register of Historic Places in Wasco County, Oregon
Houses in The Dalles, Oregon
Museums in Wasco County, Oregon
History museums in Oregon
1850 establishments in Oregon Territory